The Canton of Saint-Romain-de-Colbosc is a canton situated in the Seine-Maritime département and in the Normandy region of northern France.

Geography 
An area of farming and light industry in the arrondissement of Le Havre, centred on the town of Saint-Romain-de-Colbosc. The altitude varies from 0m (La Cerlangue) to 135m (La Remuée) with an average altitude of 107m.

Composition 
At the French canton reorganisation which came into effect in March 2015, the canton was expanded from 18 to 38 communes:

Angerville-Bailleul
Annouville-Vilmesnil
Auberville-la-Renault
Bec-de-Mortagne
Bénarville
Bornambusc
Bréauté
Bretteville-du-Grand-Caux
La Cerlangue
Daubeuf-Serville
Écrainville
Épretot
Étainhus
Goderville
Gommerville
Gonfreville-Caillot
Graimbouville
Grainville-Ymauville
Houquetot
Manneville-la-Goupil
Mentheville
Oudalle
La Remuée
Sainneville
Saint-Aubin-Routot
Saint-Gilles-de-la-Neuville
Saint-Laurent-de-Brèvedent
Saint-Maclou-la-Brière
Saint-Romain-de-Colbosc
Saint-Sauveur-d'Émalleville
Saint-Vigor-d'Ymonville
Saint-Vincent-Cramesnil
Sandouville
Sausseuzemare-en-Caux
Tocqueville-les-Murs
Les Trois-Pierres 
Vattetot-sous-Beaumont
Virville

Population

See also 
 Arrondissements of the Seine-Maritime department
 Cantons of the Seine-Maritime department
 Communes of the Seine-Maritime department

References

Saint-Romain-de-Colbosc